is a Japanese stationery company known for creating and marketing cute characters such as Tarepanda, Rilakkuma, and Sumikko Gurashi. The characters are usually anthropomorphic representations of animals or inanimate objects. Each character has its own quirky traits; for example, Momobuta is a pig with a head shaped like a peach, who enjoys karaoke and painting her nails. San-X head designer and creator of Tarepanda, Hikaru Suemasa said in 1999: "It's not just being cute. There is something different - a relaxed look, powerless".

San-X characters can be found on stationery sets and pencils, as  collectibles, and stuffed toys. They are sold as blind boxes, gashapon and in UFO catchers and other prize machines in Japan's arcades. There are also anime series, video games and books featuring the characters.

History
San-X was founded in April 1932 as a privately owned business under the name Chida Handler. In October 1942, Chida Handler became a limited company. Chida Handler's name was changed to San-X in May 1973. The name San-X derives from an earlier logo which was a row of three X characters. San is three in Japanese.

Before Tarepanda became a hit, most of San-X products did not rely on characters. They continue to sell products like stationery with scenic shots and illustrations. In 1987 San-X created Pinny-Mu, their biggest character up until then. In 1999 Kogepan was created, which was adapted to an anime series in 2001. Mamegoma was created in 2005 and adapted to an anime series in 2009. In 2003, Aki Kondo created Rilakkuma, San-X's most successful character to date.

In 2010 The New York Times described San-X as a smaller, nimbler company, with potential to surpass the Sanrio corporation. The San-X characters Tarepanda and Rilakkuma were described as "huge hits in Japan" that were rising in the Character Databank character popularity charts while Sanrio's Hello Kitty character slumped in popularity, especially in Japan.

Sumikko Gurashi was created by Yuri Yokomizo in 2012, and an animated theatrical feature film with the characters was released in 2019. Also in 2019, a stop motion animated series featuring Rilakkuma, called Rilakkuma and Kaoru, began streaming on Netflix. As of 2019 San-X had about 35 designers, creating original characters and making designs for stationery and other merchandise.

List of characters

Animals
Afro Ken - a dog with an afro
Abauchuu - A young mouse with a sloppy nature.
Azarashi Chap - A seal.
Berry Puppy - cute white dog that really likes strawberries
Buru Buru Dog - an extremely tiny, constantly trembling and weeping dog
Chawanko - A tea bowl puppy.
Cherry Berry - Two adorable rabbits with cherries and berries.
Chibi Hamucha - An itty-bitty little hamster who loves clovers.
Chibi Moomo. - A small cow.
Chiikaba - A really little hippopotamus. His head is heavy, his mouth is big. There are many of them.
Chiwawanko - Chihuahua dogs.
Chocopa - The panda child, Chocopa, loves chocolate. Every day, she only ate chocolate. One day, she became brown and turned into a bear.
Chou-Fleur - Chou-Fleur is 'cauliflower' in French. A charming female pink fluffy bunny who looks like a cauliflower. 
Corocoro Coronya - A cat who loves coronet bread. 
Dakkusukun - Two miniature dachshunds carry guitars on their backs and can't survive without them.
Dande no Kimochi - A lion who shows his mood through his dandelion-coloured mane.
Dapan - A strong team formed for the World Cup.
Ecoala - Carefree koala.
Flying Elephant - an elephant that can fly using a bubble that he blows from his nose, released in February 2003. 
Fukofuko Usagi - A fluffy rabbit who loves taking baths.
Funyofunyo - A mysterious character who looks like a jellyfish. Always carefree and having a good time.
Hanakobuta - A pig who talks with his nose instead of his mouth.
Hariinu - A hedgehog dog.
Harinezutan - a fashion-conscious hedgehog character, launched in February 2003. 
Homekoro - a round, brown Pomeranian.
Hoshikuma - A sun bear.
Iiwaken - A Shiba Inu.
Jewel Cat - A pretty cat whose eyes are made of jewels and lives in a jewel box
Jinbei San - A whale shark that swims silently in the bright sea.
Kamonohashikamo - a platypus that is yellow and confused about having a good time.
Kawaii Collection - A collection of 7 rabbit characters, released in April 2010 
Kyoo Usa - A rabbit that can use all Japanese style things.
Kerori - A frog that changes color according to its mood
Key Rabbits - Two rabbits who are always polishing their important keys.
Kireizukin Seikatu - A lazy raccoon named Mar who transforms into a hard-worker when wearing a red hood.
Koinu no Toromi - A French bulldog puppy who looks like mochi and moves slowly 
Kutsushita Nyanko - a black cat wearing socks on his every leg. 
Mamegoma - Little seals that enjoy eating soybeans.
Marimokochan - Seaweed balls made from marimo
Maigonoko - blue whale friend of Jinbei San, always sprouting water.
Mixed Cats - A group of cats drawn like watercolors originally created for use on stationery
Momobuta - A pig with a head shaped like a peach, who enjoys karaoke and painting her nails
Monokuro Boo - A black pig and a white pig. There is usually a bee buzzing around them, and the phrase "Simple is Best" or "Are you happy?"
Nakayoshi Net - A collection of happy animals
Nemurineko - A sleepy cat that sleeps with good posture
Nijinomukō - Another collection of happy animals, drawn in a more sketchy style
Norucchi - A tiny, fluffy yellow cat, often seen with Kutsuitanyanko, but it becomes smaller.
Nyan Nyan Nyanko - Small, usually white kittens that imitate various items, most commonly food. They also appear as everyday items, such as toys, school supplies, or household necessities. The term "Nyan" or "nyaa" is a Japanese onomatopoeic word for a cat's meow. "Ko" is a word which in Japanese connotes with "child" or "young." Together they make the childish/cutesy word for kitten.
Nyanpuku - A good luck cat god which resembles a maneki-neko
Piggy Girl - Nails today, shopping tomorrow. For the sake of being cute every day, she does her best with all her might. A young female pig.
Pinny Mu - A woodland bear
Rilakkuma - A brown bear who lives in the house of an office lady (OL) named Kaoru
Sentimental Circus - After the whole town is felt asleep quietly, neglected abandoned toys are awaking one by one and gathering together.
Sumikko Gurashi - A group of animals (and food items) with personality issues that like corners 
Tarepanda - A lazy panda
Tohoho na Dog - A dog with a tire on his head
Tsugi no Hi Kerori - A frog of tomorrow. Kerori is either white or green depending on his mood.
Wan Wan Wanco - A collection of dogs, real dog photos with drawn backgrounds
Waraneko - A black cat that plays the piano.
Zombbit - Rabbits that became zombies

Food
Amagurichan - A chestnut character. Amaguri (which translates as sweet chestnut) is a popular snack in Asia. Amagurichan is always energetic, and the phrases 'eat me' and 'peel my skin' are his favourites. He is happy but doesn't have a very patient character and runs away when people don't eat it quick enough. Chestnuts from Tienjin, which is Amagurichan's home, have natural sweetness and roast deliciously.
Cheese Family - A collection of cheese characters.
Ginshari-san - A little rice grain who is often found at the bottom of the rice bowl. It is believed that he is always found there, because he doesn't want to be eaten. By hiding in the bottom of the bowl, he gets to take a nap and avoid chopsticks.
Goringo - A yellow girl apple and a red boy apple
Kinakochan to Ankochan - Little soy bean flour and little red bean paste who are close friends.
Kogepan - A burnt red bean bread bun who lives in a bakery, trying to fit in and make friends with the other bread items. Happiness for him is always short-lived, so he has the tendency to get drunk on milk.
Mamepyon - A pea family.
Mikanbouya - A tangerine who likes candy and dislikes cold weather.
Soreike Otamachan! - an onion character who is genuine but overly sentimental.
Tenshinchan - a dim sum character, released in September 2005 
Tomatorichan - a red tomato-headed character with a mouth like that of a chicken beak
Tottemo Kantankun - Tottemo Kantankun's favorite phrase is "Simple, simple."
Tsurutsuru Ramenchan - a ramen character, released in July 2003 
Yōguru-kun - a yogurt character, launched in May 2003.
Yunomichan - a Japanese tea character designed as a yunomi teacup, released in February 2002

Objects
Bonsaisan - A conceited moss bonsai. For some reason, you cannot hate him. He's a bonsai but it seems he won't be able to heal you.
HAPPY SUNsan - A happy sun. 
Ishikorokun - A little rolling rock.
Neko no Panya - Cat's Bread Shop.
Tissue-san - a box of tissues. His friends include a roll of toilet paper, a pair of pocket tissues and a box of ecologically friendly tissues made of 50% recycled paper.
Wanroom - a collection of household items with dog faces. Their slogan is "Let's enjoy Wanroom life!" Each Wanroom character has a name like Inusofa (a couch), Wano'clock (an alarm clock) and Sabowan (a cactus).

Spirits
Atsugari-san - a spirit who hates the cold and loves hot dumplings. He's a fairy who is found at places where the temperature is over 30 degrees Celsius - like tea, hot food and such. He is also called "Hot Head". He operates in groups, and perspires 10 buckets of sweat per day. He's not of danger to mankind - although not of much use either.  Atsugari-san is afraid of Samugari-san, who is his exact opposite.
Baketamachan - Little ghost egg. He is extremely runny and half-cooked. His hobby is changing his form.
Beer-chan- a 20-year-old beer fairy who enjoys beer.
Boku Tsucchii - a tsuchinoko character that loves shimeji mushrooms, released February 2002
Chokotto Iikoto! - A little kappa who lives in my house. Able to put me at ease with a single heart-warming word. 
Nagomimakuri - a friendly spirit who lives in clear waters and deep in the forest. It resembles a salamander but is still different in some ways. Her main features is her soft form and the way she moves around. It leads a lazy life in the nature and rolls here and there slowly.
Oyasumi Bakura - a tapir dream spirit who looks like a pillow
Sabokappa - a kappa combined with a cactus. The toys come with small scented packets so they can be used as air fresheners.
Samugari-san - a spirit who loves the cold and is the antagonist of Atsugari-san. He's a faerie who is found at places where the temperature below zero and stays beside people who tell scary stories or boring jokes. He is also called "Cold Head" and is only seen when captured inside ice cubes. As soon as the ice melts he vanishes. He operates on his own. His weakness is that if his scarf (which is made from his hair) is removed, he'll catch a cold. His favorite food is jelly. Samugari-san and Atsugari-san dislike each other.

References

External links
San-X Official Website 
San-X Official Website 

Retail companies based in Tokyo
Mass media companies based in Tokyo
Japanese brands
Retail companies established in 1932
Toy companies of Japan
Design companies established in 1932
1932 establishments in Japan